Melvin Krol (born 8 January 1998) is a German footballer who last played as a forward for Holstein Kiel II.

References

External links
 
 

1998 births
Living people
Footballers from Hamburg
German footballers
Association football forwards
SV Werder Bremen II players
Holstein Kiel II players
3. Liga players
Regionalliga players